Mound City National Cemetery is a United States National Cemetery located near Mound City, in Pulaski County, Illinois. It encompasses , and as of the end of 2005, had 8,098 interments. Administered by the United States Department of Veterans Affairs, it is managed by the Jefferson Barracks National Cemetery.  This cemetery is listed on the National Register of Historic Places.

History 
During the American Civil War, Mound City was the site of the Mound City Civil War Naval Hospital. The cemetery was used to inter both Union and Confederate soldiers who died while under care at the hospital. After it was officially declared a National Cemetery in 1864, several nearby battlefield cemeteries arranged to have their remains reinterred there.

Mound City National Cemetery was listed in the National Register of Historic Places in 1997.

Notable monuments 
 The Illinois State Soldiers and Sailors Monument, a marble monument erected in 1874.

Notable burials
 John Basil Turchin (1821–1901), Russian-born, United States Civil War Union Army brigadier general.

References

External links
 National Cemetery Administration
 Mound City National Cemetery
 
 
 

Cemeteries on the National Register of Historic Places in Illinois
Historic American Landscapes Survey in Illinois
United States national cemeteries
Illinois in the American Civil War
National Register of Historic Places in Pulaski County, Illinois
Protected areas of Pulaski County, Illinois
1864 establishments in Illinois